Kivalina  is a city and village in Northwest Arctic Borough, Alaska, United States. The population was 377 at the 2000 census and 374 as of the 2010 census.

The island on which the village lies is threatened by rising sea levels and coastal erosion caused by climate change. , it is predicted that the island will be inundated by 2025. In addition to well-publicized impacts of climate change, the Village of Kivalina has been a party in several environmentally related court cases.

History
Kivalina is an Inupiat community first reported as "Kivualinagmut" in 1847 by Lt. Lavrenty Zagoskin of the Imperial Russian Navy. It has long been a stopping place for travelers between Arctic coastal areas and Kotzebue Sound communities. Three bodies and artifacts were  found in 2009 representing the Ipiutak culture, a pre-Thule, non-whaling civilization that disappeared over a millennium ago.

It is the only village in the region where people hunt the bowhead whale. The original village was located at the north end of the Kivalina Lagoon, but was relocated.

In about 1900, reindeer were brought to the area and some people were trained as reindeer herders.

An airstrip was built at Kivalina in 1960. Kivalina incorporated as a second-class city in 1969. During the 1970s, a new school and an electric system were constructed in the city.

On December 5, 2014 the only general store in Kivalina burned down. In July 2015, a newer store was opened after months of rebuilding to make the store more convenient and safe.

Geography

Climate
Kivalina has a dry subarctic climate with long very cold winters and short cool summers. August is the wettest month of the year, while December is the snowiest month.

Demographics

Kivalina first appeared on the 1920 U.S. Census as an unincorporated (native) village. It formally incorporated in 1969.

As of the census of 2010, there were 374 people, and 99 households. The racial makeup of the village was 3.45% White and 96.55% Native American. The Native Village of Kivalina is a federally recognized tribe with an elected tribal council. The City of Kivalina, organized under the Northwest Arctic Borough under the State of Alaska, has an elected mayor and city administrator and a 7-member city council. Per the Alaska Native Claims Settlement Act, NANA Corporation owns the surface and sub-surface rights to the city site and surrounding area. Manilaaq Association serves the community as an Alaska Native non-profit regional corporation providing social, tribal and health care services.

In 2010, there were 78 households, out of which 61.5% had children under the age of 18 living with them, 62.8% were married couples living together, 15.4% had a female householder with no husband present, and 17.9% were non-families. 16.7% of all households were made up of individuals, and 3.8% had someone living alone who was 65 years of age or older. The average household size was 4.83 and the average family size was 5.50. In the village the population was spread out, with 44.0% under the age of 18, 13.3% from 18 to 24, 20.7% from 25 to 44, 15.9% from 45 to 64, and 6.1% who were 65 years of age or older. The median age was 21 years. For every 100 females, there were 106.0 males. For every 100 females age 18 and over, there were 113.1 males.

The median income for a household in the village was $30,833, and the median income for a family was $30,179. Males had a median income of $31,875 versus $21,875 for females. The per capita income for the village was $8,360. About 25.4% of families and 26.4% of the population were below the poverty line, including 27.9% of those under age 18 and 30.0% of those age 65 or over.

Environmental issues
Due to severe sea wave erosion during storms, the city hopes to relocate again to a new site  from the present site; studies of alternate sites are ongoing. According to the U.S. Army Corps of Engineers, the estimated cost of relocation runs between $95 and $125 million, whereas the Government Accountability Office (GAO) estimates it to be between $100 and $400 million.

In 2011, Haymarket Books published "Kivalina: A Climate Change Story" by Christine Shearer.

Kivalina v. ExxonMobil Corporation

The city of Kivalina and a federally recognized tribe, the Alaska Native Village of Kivalina, sued ExxonMobil, eight other oil companies, 14 power companies and one coal company in a lawsuit filed in federal court in San Francisco on February 26, 2008, claiming that the large amounts of greenhouse gases they emit contribute to global warming that threatens the community's existence. The lawsuit estimated the cost of relocation at $400 million. The suit was dismissed by the United States district court on September 30, 2009, on the grounds that regulating greenhouse emissions was a political rather than a legal issue and one that needed to be resolved by Congress and the Administration rather than by courts.

Kivalina v Teck Cominco 
In 2004, Kivalina sued Canadian mining company Teck Cominco, operator of the Red Dog Mine, for polluting its water drinking water source and subsistence fish resources through their discharge of mine waste into the Wulik River.  Teck Cominco settled the suit in 2008 by agreeing to build a wastewater pipeline from the mine to the ocean that would bypass discharging into the Wulik River. However, the pipeline was not constructed and the alternative settlement clause was followed.

Kivalina v. US EPA 
In 2010, the Native Village of Kivalina IRA Council brought suit against the US EPA for failing to adequately address public comments in their permitting of the Red Dog Mine discharge plan under the National Pollutant Discharge Elilmination System (NPDES).  In 2012, the US Ninth Circuit court upheld the decision of the EPA Appeals Board to not review the permit, citing the insufficiency of the Tribe's argument.

Orange goo
On August 4, 2011, it was reported that residents of the city of Kivalina had seen a strange orange goo wash up on the shores. According to the Associated Press, "Tests have been conducted on the substance on the surface of the water in Kivalina. City Administrator Janet Mitchell told the Associated Press that the substance has also shown up in some residents' rain buckets." On August 8, 2011, Associated Press reported that the substance consisted of millions of microscopic eggs. Later, officials of the National Oceanic and Atmospheric Administration (NOAA) confirmed that the orange colored materials were some kind of crustacean eggs or embryos, but subsequent examination resulted in a declaration that the substance consisted of spores from a possibly undescribed species of rust fungus, later revealed to be Chrysomyxa ledicola.

Sea level rise and coastal erosion 
On numerous occasions the community has been inundated by storm surges and been forced to evacuate.  While the risk of inundation from sea water has always existed, storms caused extensive flooding in 1970, 1976, 2002, 2004, and spurred a village-wide evacuation in 2007.  To slow erosion, the US Army Corps of Engineers conducted a rip-rap revetment project along the tip of the barrier island and adjacent to the airport.

Other climate change impacts 
In addition to increased flooding from storm surges, bank erosion along the Wulik River causes increased turbidity which affects the city's drinking water source and complicates water treatment.

Relocation 
Due to severe sea wave erosion during storms, the city hopes to relocate again to a new site 12 km (7.5 mi) from the present site.  In 2009, Kivalina was identified by a GAO report as one of 31 environmentally threatened communities in Alaska.  Relocation to a site off the barrier island to higher ground has had little progress.   According to the U.S. Army Corps of Engineers, the estimated cost of relocation runs between $95 and $125 million, whereas the Government Accountability Office (GAO) estimates it to be between $100 and $400 million.  In 2018, a decision was made to build an evacuation road across the Kivalina Lagoon to provide a means for the community to escape devastating storms that can inundate the barrier island.  Additionally, the road will connect the village with the proposed new school site on K-Hill.

Kivalina in the media 
Kivalina's environmental issues were prominently featured in The 2015 Weather Channel documentary "Alaska: State of Emergency" hosted by Dave Malkoff. Kivalina was one of the two towns featured in the Al Jazeera English Fault Lines documentary, When the Water Took the Land. The community, who were originally nomadic, were given an ultimatum that they would have to settle in the permanent community or their children would be taken from them. The village's plight was also examined in Kivalina, an hourlong documentary released as part of the PBS World series America ReFramed.  The Atlantic did a photo journalism story documenting climate change in Kivalina in their September 2019 article, The Impact of Climate Change on Kivalina, Alaska.

Education
The McQueen School, operated by the Northwest Arctic Borough School District, serves the community.  it had 141 students, with Alaska Natives making up 100% of the student body.

See also
 Kivalina Airport

References

Further reading 
 
 
 
 
</ref>
Kivalina Strategic Management Plan<ref>
City of Kivalina Local Hazards Mitigation Plan

External links 

 Re-Locate Kivalina
 America ReFramed: Kivalina (documentary)
 Alaska Climate Change Impact Mitigation Program: Kivalina at Department of Commerce, Community, and Economic Development, State of Alaska

Chukchi Sea
Cities in Alaska
Cities in Northwest Arctic Borough, Alaska
Populated coastal places in Alaska on the Arctic Ocean
Populated places of the Arctic United States